Osman Güldemir is a Turkish writer and teacher of Turkish cuisine, he is and has been a tutor at food culture classes at different colleges and universities in Turkey. In November 2015 his book about the food culture of the Ottoman Empire 'Bir Osmanlı Yemek Yazması-Kitabüt Tabbahin' was published.

Gallery

References and selected books

Turkish food writers
Turkish male writers
Year of birth missing (living people)
Living people